Andrei Vadimovich Sekretov (born 13 December 1989) is a Russian professional football player.

Club career
He made his Russian Premier League debut for FC Amkar Perm on 22 August 2010 in a game against FC Sibir Novosibirsk.

External links
 

1989 births
Sportspeople from Perm, Russia
Living people
Russian footballers
FC Amkar Perm players
Russian Premier League players
FC Nizhny Novgorod (2007) players
FC Sokol Saratov players
Association football midfielders
FC Orenburg players
FC Neftekhimik Nizhnekamsk players
FC Gornyak Uchaly players
FC Zvezda Perm players